Sing Me a Song is a 1994 album by Miriam Makeba. It was her first album recorded in South Africa, in a studio in Mmabatho, Bophuthatswana.

Track listing
Sing Me a Song	
Bass Rap	
N'Diarabi	
Moody Moods	
Thula Mntanami	
Generation Rap	
Known Unsung Hero	
I Long to Return	
Serenade Me	
Bambarana	
Choo Choo Train / Shuku Shuku	
Ivory Song	
My People	
Laktushona Ilanga	
Good Grunge	
Prendre Un Enfant

References

1994 albums
Miriam Makeba albums
Mercury Records albums